Thalatha is a genus of moths of the family Noctuidae. The genus was erected by Francis Walker in 1862.

Species
Thalatha argentea Warren, 1912 New Guinea
Thalatha artificiosa Turner, 1936 Queensland
Thalatha bryochlora (Meyrick, 1897) Tasmania, New South Wales
Thalatha caledonica (Holloway, 1979) New Caledonia
Thalatha chionobola (Turner, 1941) Queensland
Thalatha costigma (Turner, 1929) Western Australia
Thalatha dinawa (Bethune-Baker, 1906) New Guinea
Thalatha ekeikei (Bethune-Baker, 1906) New Guinea
Thalatha guttalis (Walker, [1866]) Queensland
Thalatha japonica Sugi, 1982 Japan
Thalatha kebeae (Bethune-Baker, 1906) New Guinea
Thalatha melanophrica Turner, 1922 Queensland
Thalatha melanostrota Hampson, 1916 Somalia
Thalatha occidens Hampson, 1911 southern Nigeria
Thalatha sinens (Walker, 1857) India, Myanmar, Borneo
Thalatha symprepes (Turner, 1933) Queensland
Thalatha trichromoides (Poole, 1989) New South Wales

See also
 Talata (disambiguation)

References

Acronictinae